

Events
July 4 – John Kelly and John Clinton, members of the Whyos, are tried at Essex Market Street Court and convicted of assaulting Naty Glashiem and stealing his gold watch and chain.
August 10 – Several members of the 74th Street Gang, including William "Red" Carroll, James Fitzpatrick, James Beatty, Louis Gavious (or Fitzpatrick) and John "Noble" Hughes, are arrested by a Capt. Gunner of the 28th Precinct after the death of one of their victims, Nawclaw Kalat, who dies of his injuries earlier that day. Kalat, who had been fighting with another Bohemian immigrant on Avenue A, had been severely injured when members of the gang joined in the fight.
November 26 – Patrick O'Brien and Michael Flannagan, both members of the Whyos, are arrested and charged with the assault and robbery of fireman William Clark on the night of November 25. O'Brien's brother, having been present at the court house at the time of Patrick O'Brien's arrest, left with another gang member to get a lawyer for his brother. However, in an attempt to raise enough money for a lawyer, he was caught attempting to steal a gold watch from a visiting businessman Ebenezer S. Willis. As he was being brought into custody, he assaulted an acquaintance John Gagin who had agreed to testify against O'Brien having witnessed the theft.

Arts and literature

Births
Frankie Yale (Francesco Uale), Unione Siciliane leader, Five Points Gang member, (New York) Black Hand member, and New York bootlegger.

Deaths

References

Years in organized crime
Organized crime